The Raleigh Club was a dining club founded in 1827. It met at the 'Thatched House', a tavern in the St James area of London as an alternative to the Travellers Club.

It was founded by Sir Arthur de Capell Brooke as a place where real exploring travellers could meet, exchange tales, and try the cuisine of far-off lands.

It served as a sort of nursery for the Royal Geographical Society and became subsumed by that body later in the century.

Prominent early members included Sir John Barrow and Alexander Burnes.

Dining clubs
Geography organizations
Travelers organizations
Organizations established in 1827
Clubs and societies in London
1827 establishments in England